Ali Aghamirzaei Jenaghrad (born 4 March 1993 in Bandar Anzali) is an Iranian canoeist. He represented Iran at the 2020 Summer Olympics in Tokyo 2021, competed in men's K-1 1000 metres.

References

External links
 
 Profile at Asian Games 2014
 Profile at icf.ir (in Persian)

Living people
1993 births
People from Bandar-e Anzali
Iranian male canoeists
Asian Games silver medalists for Iran
Asian Games bronze medalists for Iran
Olympic canoeists of Iran
Canoeists at the 2020 Summer Olympics
Asian Games medalists in canoeing
Canoeists at the 2014 Asian Games
Canoeists at the 2018 Asian Games
Medalists at the 2014 Asian Games
Medalists at the 2018 Asian Games
Canoeists at the 2010 Summer Youth Olympics
Sportspeople from Gilan province